The Central Pangean Mountains were an extensive northeast–southwest trending mountain range in the central portion of the supercontinent Pangaea during the Carboniferous, Permian and Triassic periods. They were formed as a result of collision between the minor supercontinents Laurussia and Gondwana during the formation of Pangaea. At its greatest elevation during the early part of the Permian period, it was comparable to the present Himalayas. Remnants of this massive mountain range include the Appalachian Mountains and Ouachita Mountains of North America and the Little Atlas of Morocco, Africa. 

A number of mountain building periods were involved in the formation of the Central Pangean Mountains, including the Acadian, Caledonian, Alleghenian, Mauritanide and Variscan orogenies.

The eastern portions of the range are also called the Variscan Mountains.

Formation and decline 
The Central Pangean Mountains were formed during the collision of Laurasia and northern Gondwana as part of the Variscan and Alleghanian orogenies, which began during the Carboniferous approximately 340 million years ago, and complete by the beginning of the Permian around 295 million years ago, when the range was at its maximum elevation. During the Permian, the mountain range was subjected to intense physical and mechanical weathering, reducing the peaks to around half their original size by the Late Permian (Lopingian) and creating numerous deep intermontane valleys. By the Middle Triassic, the Central Pangean mountains had been substantially reduced in size, and by the earliest Jurassic around 200 million years ago the Pangean range in Western Europe had been reduced to a few upland areas surrounded by deep marine basins.

Climate 
Climate modeling suggests that the Central Pangean Mountains contributed to the deposition of vast quantities of coal in the late Carboniferous. The mountains created an area of year-round heavy precipitation, with no dry season typical of a monsoon climate. This is necessary for the preservation of peat in coal swamps. During the early-mid Permian, the Central Pangean Mountains lay directly beneath the equatorial rainy belt. Data from the loess deposits of the Salagou Formation in France, dating to the Permian, indicates that the upland areas of the Central Pangean Mountains were likely glaciated, despite being located at the equator. Due to their immense size and orientation nearly parallel to the equator, during the Late Permian the Central Pangean Mountains created a rain shadow to the north of the range, blocking the monsoonal rains from the Southern Hemisphere, and contributed to the formation of the immense Zechstein salt deposits in Europe.

References

Mountain ranges
Mountain ranges of Africa
Mountain ranges of Europe
Mountain ranges of North America
Triassic paleogeography
Triassic Africa
Triassic Europe
Triassic United States
Appalachian Mountains
Atlas Mountains